Timothy Mellon (born July 22, 1942) is an American businessman, and the chairman and majority owner of Pan Am Systems, a Portsmouth, New Hampshire-based transportation holding company. He is a grandson of Andrew W. Mellon and an heir to the Mellon banking fortune.

Early life
The son of Paul Mellon and his first wife, Mary Conover Brown, Timothy Mellon holds a degree in city planning from Yale University. He is the grandson of Treasury Secretary Andrew Mellon.

Career
He was the chief financier in the 1977 formation of Guilford Transportation Industries (GTI), a holding company named for his native Guilford, Connecticut. In 1981, GTI purchased the Maine Central Railroad from U.S. Filter Corporation, adding the Boston & Maine and Delaware & Hudson railroads in 1983 and 1984, respectively, and in 1998 purchased the brand of bankrupt Pan American World Airways. The Pan Am name was subsequently succeeded by "Pan Am Clipper Connection," operated by subsidiary Boston-Maine Airways, which ceased operations in 2008 due to lack of financial fitness.

Mellon stepped down as trustee of the Andrew W. Mellon Foundation in 2002 after 21 years on its board.

Mellon moved to Wyoming from Connecticut in 2005.

In November 2020, Mellon sold the Goodspeed Airport, which he had purchased in 1999 for $2.33 million, to New England Airport Associates, LLC, for $891,000.

Political donations

In 2010, Mellon donated $1.5 million to Arizona's defense fund to help cover the costs of legal challenges against Arizona SB 1070, the broadest and strictest anti-illegal immigration measure in the United States at the time of its passage. It has received national and international attention and has spurred considerable controversy.

In the 2018 election cycle, Mellon was a major political donor, especially to the Republican-aligned Congressional Leadership Fund.

Mellon's self-published autobiography describes his political views. Mellon called social safety net programs "Slavery Redux," adding: "For delivering their votes in the Federal Elections, they are awarded with yet more and more freebies: food stamps, cell phones, WIC payments, Obamacare, and on, and on, and on. The largess is funded by the hardworking folks, fewer and fewer in number, who are too honest or too proud to allow themselves to sink into this morass." Mellon wrote that as of 1984 (Reagan's re-election campaign), "Something had obviously gone dreadfully wrong with the Great Society and the Liberal onslaught. Poor people had become no less poor. Black people, in spite of heroic efforts by the 'Establishment' to right the wrongs of the past, became even more belligerent and unwilling to pitch in to improve their own situations," and that "Drugs rose to the level of epidemic. Single parent families became more and more prevalent. The likes of Jesse Jackson and Al Sharpton pandered endlessly to fan the flames."

In August 2021, Mellon donated $53.1 million in stock to the State of Texas to pay for construction of walls along the US–Mexico border.

Search for Amelia Earhart
Mellon donated over $1 million in 2012 to The International Group for Historic Aircraft Recovery (TIGHAR) as part of its efforts to locate Amelia Earhart's plane and remains. Mellon filed a racketeering lawsuit against TIGHAR in 2013, alleging that the non-profit organization engaged in deceit in soliciting his money to search for Amelia Earhart's missing plane. Mellon claimed that the plane was already found in 2010.

U.S. District Judge Skavdahl granted TIGHAR's motion for summary judgment in 2014, after recognizing that even Mellon's own experts were unable to confirm Mellon's allegations regarding the 2010 photographs that Mellon claimed showed the presence of the plane. Judge Skavdahl concluded that: "Defendants represented to Plaintiff they were planning another expedition in their continued quest to find the wreckage of Amelia Earhart's airplane. Upon reading about Defendants' efforts, Plaintiff contacted Defendants and expressed his interest in supporting the expedition with a monetary contribution. That's exactly what the parties then did. No false representations were made. The lost had not been found ... or maybe it had. Regardless, no rational trier of fact could find Defendants falsely represented they had not found Earhart's plane by embarking on another expedition in hopes of finding conclusive evidence to prove it. No matter how convinced or sincere Plaintiff is in his subjective belief and opinion that Amelia Earhart's airplane was or should have been discovered prior to the making of his donation, that belief and opinion is insufficient to create a genuine dispute of material fact."

Mellon appealed to the U.S. Court of Appeals for the Tenth Circuit, which affirmed the district court's ruling, without holding oral argument. The Tenth Circuit concluded that the lack of actionable falsity precluded Mellon's claims.

References

Mellon family
People from Guilford, Connecticut
Businesspeople from Wyoming
Living people
Yale University alumni
Pan Am people
Pan Am Railways
American billionaires
1942 births
People from Saratoga, Wyoming